The 1952 United States presidential election in Texas was held on November 4, 1952. It was part of the 1952 United States presidential election held throughout all contemporary forty-eight states. Voters chose twenty-four representatives, or electors, to the Electoral College, who voted for president and vice president.

The Republican Party candidate, former General of the Army and Supreme Allied Commander Europe Dwight D. Eisenhower, won his birth state Texas with 53% of the vote against Illinois Governor Adlai Stevenson, carrying the state's 24 electoral votes. Eisenhower had been endorsed by the Texas Democratic Party at their state convention. Despite losing most southern and eastern areas of the state to Stevenson, Eisenhower managed to carry Texas by a margin of 6.44 points. Eisenhower's victory in the state made him only the second Republican to carry the state during a presidential election, with the first Republican candidate being Herbert Hoover back in 1928, along with being the first presidential candidate to win over a million votes in Texas. Eisenhower nonetheless did lose Grayson County, the home of his birthplace, Denison.

Results

Results by county

See also
 United States presidential elections in Texas

References

1952
1952 Texas elections
Texas